Middlebrooks is a surname. Notable people with the name include:

 C. Edward Middlebrooks (born 1955), American politician from Maryland
 Donald M. Middlebrooks (born 1946), United States District Court judge
 Donald Ray Middlebrooks (born 1962), American death row inmate convicted of the murder of Kerrick Majors
 David Lycurgus Middlebrooks, Jr. (born 1926), United States federal judge
 Felicia Middlebrooks (born 1957), American radio news broadcaster
 Levy Middlebrooks (born 1966), American basketball player
 Will Middlebrooks (born 1988), American professional baseball player
 Willie Middlebrooks (born 1979), American gridiron football player
 Windell Middlebrooks (1979–2015), American actor and singer

Fictional character
 Craig Middlebrooks, from the NBC sitcom Parks and Recreation

See also
 Middlebrook (disambiguation)
Middlebrook (surname)